Camissoniopsis cheiranthifolia, the beach suncup or beach evening primrose, is a species of the evening primrose family and is native to open dunes and sandy soils of coastal California, Baja California and Oregon.

Description 
The beach suncup grows prostrate along the beach surface, forming mats more than 1 m across. It forms long stems growing from a central crown, lined with silvery grey-green leaves. The prostrate form and swinging stems allow the plant to survive well on the windy, shifting sands of the coast. The four-petalled flowers open in the morning (typical among suncups) and are bright yellow, fading to reddish.

Taxonomy 
This plant is a well-defined diploid (2n = 14) species that has varying floral traits over its geographic distribution.

The specific epithet cheiranthifolia refers to the leaves having the appearance of Cheiranthus, an old name for a wallflower genus.

The two subspecies are:

 Camissoniopsis cheiranthifolia subsp. cheiranthifolia – A perennial herb that rarely has dense and silvery hairs, distributed from the Channel Islands to Oregon. This subspecies is generally self-pollinated.
 Camissoniopsis cheiranthifolia subsp. suffruticosa  – A subshrub that generally has dense and silvery hairs, distributed from Baja California to Point Conception. This species is usually cross-pollinated and self-incompatible, and it hybridizes widely with Camissoniopsis bistorta.

Distribution and habitat 
This species grows on the coastal dunes and sandy soils from southern Oregon through California and southwards towards El Rosario in Baja California.

References

External links

Jepson Manual Treatment

cheiranthifolia
Flora of Baja California
Flora of California
Flora of Oregon
Plants described in 1825
Flora without expected TNC conservation status